Sports Tonight may refer to:

 Sports Tonight (American TV program)
 Sports Tonight (Australian TV program)
 Sports Tonight (Irish TV programme)
 Sports Tonight Live, a British television show and channel